Lucio Pellegrini (born 20 October 1965) is an Italian director and screenwriter.

Early life 
On 20 October 1965, Pellegrini was born in Asti, Italy.

Career 
Pellegrini started his career in 1992 as a television writer, collaborating with RAI, Mediaset and MTV. After directing a short film (Biodegradabile, 1997) and several commercial shorts, in 1999 he made his feature film debut with the comedy film E allora mambo!, which got him a nomination for Silver Ribbon for Best Director.

Filmography   

 E allora mambo! (1999)
 Tandem (2000)
  Now or Never (2003)
 La vita è breve ma la giornata è lunghissima (co-directed with Gianni Zanasi, 2005)
 Unlikely Revolutionaries (2010)
 The Perfect Life (2011)
 È nata una star? (2012)

References

External links 
 

1965 births
Living people 
Italian film directors
Italian television directors
Italian screenwriters
Italian male screenwriters
People from Asti
20th-century Italian people